Joynes is a surname. Notable people with the surname include:

Dickie Joynes (1877–1949), English football player
Edward Southey Joynes (1834–1917), American academic
Nathan Joynes (born 1985), English football player
William T. Joynes (1817–1874), American politician and jurist